Richmond Secondary School, (commonly, Richmond High School and RHS) is a public, co-educational secondary school located in Richmond, British Columbia, Canada, that educates approximately 1200 students from grades 8 to 12. Richmond Secondary is the only school in Richmond that offers the International Baccalaureate Diploma Programme and is a magnet school in the region.

History
Richmond Secondary School has the distinction of being the City of Richmond's first high school. Originally established in 1927 on Cambie and Sexsmith street as Richmond High School, it would undergo  numerous location, name and organizational structure changes throughout its history.

The first major change occurred in 1937 with the addition of grades 8 and 9 to the school. The school was renamed “Richmond Junior-Senior High School” to reflect this change.

In 1952, Richmond Junior-Senior High School was relocated to its current location at the intersection of Minoru Blvd and Granville Avenue. In addition, it was converted to strictly a senior high school, offering programs for grades 11 and 12 students only. Its name was changed accordingly to “Richmond Senior High School” [In 1982, at least, the name was "Richmond Senior Secondary School"]

In 1996, all schools in Richmond, including RHS, were converted to full spectrum grade 8–12 schools. Prior to this, all Richmond schools were either strictly senior or junior high schools. Richmond High was renamed “Richmond Secondary School”.

In the early 2000s, construction of a $16.6 million replacement school building began on what used to be the school's grass field. The new building opened to students in on 5 January 2004. In the same year, the previous building, which had been in use for 50 years, was torn down and replaced with an artificial turf.

Curriculum and notable programs

International Baccalaureate Programme
Richmond Secondary School has been an IB World School since July 1984 and is the only school in Richmond to offer the International Baccalaureate Diploma Programme.
The magnet  IB program provides a challenging and globally accepted curriculum for grade 11 and 12 students,  and has garnered Richmond Secondary a district-wide reputation as the "prep" school.
As of 2018/2019, the following IB courses are offered:

English A1 HL
French B HL/SL
Mandarin B HL/SL
Japanese B HL/SL
Spanish B HL/SL
Geography HL/SL
History HL
Digital Society HL/SL
Business Management HL/SL
Chemistry HL/SL 
Biology HL/SL 
Physics HL/SL
Mathematics AA HL/SL
Theatre Arts HL
Visual Arts HL/SL
Music HL/SL
Theory of Knowledge (TOK)
Creativity, Activity, Service (CAS)
Extended Essay (EE)

Global Perspectives Program
Richmond Secondary offers the Global Perspectives Program for Grade 12 students. Founded by  former RHS teacher Ken Lorenz in 1995, the Global Perspectives course is a program where students embark on humanitarian trips to provide aid for those in developing countries.
The Global Perspectives team of 2012/2013 assisted the Samoa government in repairing damages caused by the 2009 Samoa earthquake and tsunami. This represented the 19th annual project since the programme's conception.

AVID program
Richmond Secondary is currently one of the first pioneer schools in Canada to offer the AVID program (Advancement Via Individual Determination) to grade 9–12 students. The AVID program is an academic support program that prepares students for post-secondary education and enrollment, started in 1980 at Clairemont High School in San Diego.

Pre-employment and career-prep programs
Richmond Secondary houses numerous courses and programs designed to prepare students for life beyond high school and the workforce. In addition to applied skills elective courses such as drafting and CAD, woodworks, metal fabrication, and automotives, students may also choose to enroll in the pre-employment program. This program combines academics and work experience and aims to help students develop skills necessary for the job
market.

Richmond Secondary also hosts the school district's only student chef training program. The school is equipped with a full kitchen, in which student-trainees prepare meals and desserts for other students and faculty to be served during breakfast and lunch hours. Richmond Secondary also has a well-equipped metal and woodworking shop, theatre, and music room.

RHS also hosts the "Colt Young Parent Program", a program designed to meet the needs of pregnant and parenting teenagers.

Athletics
Richmond Secondary currently offers numerous athletic teams for students including basketball, cross country, soccer, volleyball, swimming, golf, badminton, Ultimate Frisbee, table tennis, and track and field.

Basketball
The Richmond High basketball team were perennial provincial championship contenders in the 1980s and 90s under BC Basketball Hall of Fame inductee, coach Bill Disbrow. Richmond High has won a record five BC AAA Provincial Championships and produced five BC MVPs, 25 All-stars, and many players who have gone on to play in the NCAA and on the Canada national men's basketball team. Disbrow's program and the teams he worked with are viewed to be the best in Canada during the 80s and 90s.

RHS ties Vancouver College and Oak Bay High School for most number of BC provincial championships won.

Football
Richmond High also boasted a strong football team throughout the 1980s and 90s. The football program at Richmond Secondary ended in 2000 due to a shortage of players.

Ultimate Frisbee

The team has lasted for many years. But when two coaches from Vancouver joined the program in 2009, the team started to become a powerhouse. The program produced many junior national and world level players. Richmond High ended up with consecutive wins in cities and a 4th-place finish in Tier 1 provincials ('14). That marked the highest standing of a Richmond School has ever placed in provincials until 2016.

Demographics
Richmond Secondary School is notable for its racial diversity and its large Asian population. As of the 2009–2010 school year, 54.8% of students listed Chinese (either Mandarin, Cantonese, or a local dialect), and 72.3% of students reported a language other than English as the primary language used at home.
While unusual for a North American school, these figures are perhaps unsurprising for a high school situated in the city of Richmond, which has the highest percentage of immigrants of any city in Canada.

Richmond High's feeder schools are Samuel Brighouse Elementary School, William Douglas Ferris Elementary School, and Blundell Elementary School.

Notable alumni
 	
 Shaul Gordon (born 1994), Canadian-Israeli Olympic sabre fencer
 Kyle Hamilton, rower and Olympic gold medalist
 Andrew Mavis, basketball player; played for Canada at the 2000 Summer Olympics
 Jim Mills, former NFL player for the Baltimore Colts
 Gary Fung, founder and administrator of the BitTorrent index site isohunt
 Goldie Semple, actress, primarily at Shaw and Stratford Festivals
 Bobby Singh, CFL Player for the Winnipeg Blue Bombers
 Ryan Stiles, comedian, actor, director. Best known for performing in Whose Line Is It Anyway? and his role as Herb Melnick in Two and a Half Men.
 Bjarni Tryggvason, Canadian Space Agency Astronaut

References

External links
Richmond Secondary Official website
Richmond Secondary's Enrollment Report

High schools in Richmond, British Columbia
Educational institutions established in 1927
International Baccalaureate schools in British Columbia
1927 establishments in British Columbia